Thomas Patrick Cavanagh is an aerospace engineer who was sentenced in 1985 after being convicted of trying to sell stealth bomber secrets to the Soviet Union.

Biography
Cavanagh was arrested at a hotel in Commerce, California, in December 1984, by FBI agents posing as Soviet spies. Cavanagh worked at Northrop, and at the time was  undergoing a divorce, and was overly indebted. He tried to sell classified technology and information for $25,000.

He was sentenced to life in prison. He was released on March 1, 2001.

References

American people convicted of spying for the Soviet Union
American people convicted of attempted spying against the United States
Espionage in the United States
Living people
American aerospace engineers
1945 births